Falun Township may refer to:

Falun Township, Saline County, Kansas
Falun Township, Roseau County, Minnesota